"Belle" is a 1997 song performed by the Francophone singers Patrick Fiori, Daniel Lavoie and Garou, from the musical Notre-Dame de Paris. Released as a single in 1998, it was a hit in France and Belgium, topping the charts for many months. To date, the song is one of the best-selling singles of all time in these countries.

Background and writing

As for the songs from the musical, the text was written by Luc Plamondon, who had also written the musical Starmania in 1978, and the music composed by Richard Cocciante. The musical arrangements were made by Richard Cocciante, Jannick Top and Serge Perathoner who also worked on the musical direction.

"Belle" is a romantic song in which the three singers, who respectively portrayed Quasimodo (Garou), Frollo (Daniel Lavoie) and Phoebus (Patrick Fiori), reveal in turn their love for Esmeralda, before singing together the last verse.

The theme of the song is based in Victor Hugo's novel Notre Dame de Paris. In chapter VI of the Eighth book "Trois coeurs d'homme faits différemment" (Three men's hearts made differently), Phoebus, Frollo and Quasimodo watch Esmeralda who is sentenced to death. Phoebus is with his fiancée and though he pales when seeing Esmeralda proving he has feelings for her, he stays with his Fleur-de-Lys. Frollo is trying once again to propose Esmeralda a salvation, but in return he wants her to become his woman. And finally Quasimodo selflessly saves Esmeralda from death, only because of his enormous love for her.

Other recording 
Since its debut, it has been professionally played in Belgium, Canada, China, France, Italy, Japan, Lebanon, Luxembourg, Russia, Singapore, South Korea, Spain, Switzerland, Taiwan, Turkey, United Kingdom and United States, and has been translated into seven languages (English, Spanish, Italian, Russian, Korean, Flemish and Polish). The song has thus been officially adapted in these six languages, but several covers have been made in various languages.

The English-language version of the song, recorded by Steve Balsamo, Garou and Daniel Lavoie, is available on Notre Dame de Paris - Version anglaise.

Chart performance and records

The song was charted on the French Singles Chart for 60 weeks, which is to date the second single with most total weeks in the Top 100 (the number one is "U-Turn (Lili)", by AaRON, with 61 weeks), and the first one in the top 50, with 49 weeks. It entered the chart at #96 on 9 May 1998, and climbed slowly, reaching number one in its 18th week, which is one of the slowest climbs to first place. It was also the first trio to reach #1 on this chart. It had huge weekly sales when the musical was performed, from 12 September 1998. It stayed at the top for 18 consecutive weeks, which was at the time the record of the most weeks at #1 (this record was beaten in 2000 by Lou Bega's "Mambo no. 5 (a Little Bit of...)", with 20 weeks). After that, the song managed to drop slowly, totaling 31 weeks in the top ten. 
Certified Diamond disc by the SNEP, it was the best-selling single of 1998.

In Belgium (Wallonia), the single debuted at #24 on the Ultratop 40 Singles Chart, on 6 June 1998. It topped the chart for only six weeks, from 19 September to 24 October, but remained in the top ten for 30 consecutive weeks. It fell off the chart (Top 40) after 44 weeks. It is the best-selling single of the year and the most successful song from 1995 in that country.

In 1999, the song was awarded 'Song of the year' at the Victoires de la Musique.

Track listings
 CD single
 "Belle" — 4:36
 "Déchiré" by Patrick Fiori — 3:18

Charts

Weekly charts

Year-end charts

Certifications

Dadju, Gims and Slimane version

On April 5, 2021, a cover version was released by trio Dadju, Gims and Slimane on Play Two and Sony Music Entertainment reaching number 36 on SNEP, the official French Singles Chart. A music video was also released in which they play a scene from the musical Notre-Dame de Paris in a modern setting.

References

1997 songs
1998 songs
Daniel Lavoie songs
Garou (singer) songs
Patrick Fiori songs
Ultratop 50 Singles (Wallonia) number-one singles
SNEP Top Singles number-one singles
Pop ballads
Songs from musicals
Songs with lyrics by Luc Plamondon
1990s ballads
Songs written by Renaud Rebillaud
2021 singles